This is a list of episodes for the late-night Comedy Central series The Opposition with Jordan Klepper.

Episodes

2017

September

October

November

December

2018

January

February

March

April

May

June

References

External links 
 
 

Lists of American non-fiction television series episodes
Lists of variety television series episodes